Carousel of Variety is a 1955 Italian musical film directed by Aldo Bonaldi and Aldo Quinti and featuring a number of performers in a revue-style show.

Partial cast
 Totò
Anna Magnani
Aldo Fabrizi
Nino Taranto
Erminio Macario
Josephine Baker
Odoardo Spadaro
Wanda Osiris
Ettore Petrolini
Renato Rascel
Gino Latilla
Carlo Cascianelli
Mistinguett
Nicholas Brothers
Conchita Montenegro

References

Bibliography 
 Dayna Oscherwitz & MaryEllen Higgins. The A to Z of French Cinema. Scarecrow Press, 2009.

External links 
 

1957 films
1950s musical films
Italian musical films
1950s Italian-language films
1950s Italian films